John Treviño Jr. (October 18, 1938 – April 4, 2017) was an American-born politician in Austin, Texas. He is notable for becoming the first Mexican-American to serve on the Austin City Council, serving from 1975 to 1988.
Trevino was a political trailblazer and one of the most prominent Hispanics in Austin for years. He was known for his lifelong public service.  Treviño was part of a coalition that ended the exclusive grip of Anglo power in the city of Austin.

Early life and service

Treviño was born in Austin, and at age 8 volunteered to become a Catholic altar boy.  He worked at a laundry, did odd jobs and made deliveries for a local blueprint company.  His family had always had a modest income, but after he 
volunteered for a Catholic service group, the St. Vincent de Paul Society, his eyes were opened to the poverty around him.  At age 17, Treviño volunteered for the army and trained as a paratrooper in the 82nd Airborne Division. He became a paid anti-poverty worker, the first at the East First Neighborhood Center, when he was 27. In the Austin community of Montopolis, Treviño partnered with a local Catholic priest, Father Underwood, to operate a  VISTA (Volunteers in Service to America) program that had been newly created as part of the War on Poverty initiative.

Austin City Council
In the early 1970s, Treviño, Gus Garcia, Richard Moya and Gonzalo Barrientos were known by journalists as the "Young Turks" or the "Brown Machine" according to Gus Garcia. These Hispanic leaders, along with a coalition that included labor activists, African-Americans, and young voters, overturned the traditional Anglo businessmen based power structure of Austin.

In 1973, Treviño sought a seat on the Austin City Council but lost.  In 1975, he was elected and went on to serve 13 years. He contributed to a number of improvements while on the City Council, such as, started clinics across the city to provide access to health care for the poor; created what would become the Department of Small and Minority Business Resources; supported women and minorities to be included on city commissions and boards; and established a review of hiring practices to provide fair access to city jobs for minorities and women. He also helped resolve conflicts with the vendors at the Renaissance Market on Guadalupe Street.  In 1978, he became the mayor pro tem, and in 1983, he served for three months as acting mayor when then-mayor Carole Keeton was appointed to the State Board of Insurance. In 1983, Treviño received 59,905 votes for his re-election, which is the most votes ever received by an Austin City Council candidate.

Later life
The University of Texas at Austin School of Social Work nominated Treviño to attend an International Conference on Social Welfare in Helsinki, Finland. He was one of 13 Americans invited.  After scandals at the Capital Metro board of directors, Trevino was elected to help clean it up.  He served on the board from 1997 to 2009.  He was a member of the board of directors of the Greater Austin Hispanic Chamber of Commerce and he served on the International Board of the U.S./Mexico Sister Cities Association.

In 2006, the City of Austin designated a park  in his honor, the John John Treviño Jr. Metropolitan Park at Morrison Ranch. Treviño died at his Austin home in April 2017, aged 78.

References

1938 births
2017 deaths
American politicians of Mexican descent
Austin City Council members
American anti-poverty advocates
Paratroopers